Stratton, also known as Hortense Fleckenstein Farm and Solomon Scott Farm, is a historic home located at Centreville, Queen Anne's County, Maryland, United States. It is a center-passage plan house, constructed of brick laid in Flemish bond, four bays wide and one room deep, with flush brick chimneys centered on each end of a pitched gable roof. The house was built about 1790.

Stratton was listed on the National Register of Historic Places in 2003.

References

External links
, including photo from 2003, at Maryland Historical Trust

Houses in Queen Anne's County, Maryland
Houses on the National Register of Historic Places in Maryland
Houses completed in 1790
Federal architecture in Maryland
National Register of Historic Places in Queen Anne's County, Maryland
1790 establishments in Maryland